Ohau or Ōhau may refer to the following in New Zealand:

In the Manawatu-Wanganui Region
 Ōhau, semi-rural community in the Manawatu-Wanganui region
 Ohau railway station (former) in the settlement of Ōhau
 Ōhau River (Manawatū-Whanganui)

In the Canterbery Region
 Ben Ohau, a mountain in the South Island
 Ben Ohau Range
 Ōhau (skifield)
 Lake Ōhau
 Lake Ohau Alpine Village
 Ōhau River (Canterbury)
 Ōhau A power station
 Ōhau B power station
 Ōhau C power station

Elsewehre
 Ōhau / West Island the third largest of Manawatāwhi / Three Kings Islands